For a list of companies based in the Dallas-Fort Worth metroplex, go to List of companies in the Dallas-Fort Worth metroplex

This list includes companies based within the city limits of Dallas, Texas. Although the Dallas-Fort Worth Metroplex has many more corporate headquarters, including Frito Lay and American Airlines, this list only includes companies that are headquartered within the Dallas City Limits.

 Affiliated Computer Services
 Alon USA
 AT&T
 Atmos Energy
 AutoTester
 Broadleaf Commerce
 Brinker International
 Capital Senior Living
 Comerica
 Copart
 Corner Bakery Cafe
 Critical Watch
 Dave & Buster's
 Dean Foods
 El Chico
 El Fenix
 EmCare
 Energy Future Holdings
 Energy Transfer Partners
 GAINSCO
 Greyhound Bus Lines
 Haggar Clothing
 Haynes and Boone
 HBK Investments
 HKS, Inc.
 HomeVestors of America
 Hotels.com
 Interstate Batteries
 La Madeleine
 Locke, Liddell & Sapp
 Match.com
 McAfee
 Merit Energy Company
 Mizzen+Main
 Neiman Marcus
 The Odee Company
 Potato Parcel
 Regus US Division
 Ryan LLC 
 Rosewood Hotels & Resorts
 Southwest Airlines
 Tenet Healthcare
 Texas Instruments
 Trammell Crow Company
 Tuesday Morning
 TXI

Public employers
Major public sector employers headquartered in Dallas include:

Army and Air Force Exchange Service
City of Dallas
Dallas County
Dallas County Community College District
Dallas Independent School District
Parkland Health & Hospital System

References

Companies
 
Dallas